Brachyphoris is a genus comprising five species of mitosporic fungi in the family Orbiliaceae.

Species
Brachyphoris brevistipitata (B. Liu, Xing Z. Liu & W.Y. Zhuang) Juan Chen, L.L. Xu, B. Liu & Xing Z. Liu 2007
Brachyphoris helminthodes (Drechsler) Juan Chen, L.L. Xu, B. Liu & Xing Z. Liu 2007
Brachyphoris oviparasitica (G.R. Stirling & Mankau) Juan Chen, L.L. Xu, B. Liu & Xing Z. Liu 2007
Brachyphoris stenomeces (Drechsler) Juan Chen, L.L. Xu, B. Liu & Xing Z. Liu 2007
Brachyphoris tenuifusaria (Xing Z. Liu, R.H. Gao, K.Q. Zhang & L. Cao) Juan Chen, L.L. Xu, B. Liu & Xing Z. Liu 2007

References

External links

Helotiales genera